Hughes Hall is a constituent college of the University of Cambridge in England. It is the oldest of the University of Cambridge's postgraduate colleges. The college also admits undergraduates, though undergraduates admitted by the college must be aged 21 or over. There is no age requirement for postgraduate students. The majority of Hughes Hall students are postgraduate, although nearly one-fifth of the student population comprises individuals aged 21 and above who are studying undergraduate degree courses at the university.

Hughes Hall was founded in the 19th century as the Cambridge Training College for Women with the purpose of providing a college of the university dedicated to training women graduates for the teaching profession. Since then it has enlarged and expanded to support a community of students and researchers, both male and female, working in all the academic domains encompassed by the University of Cambridge.

The college is housed in a number of 19th- and 20th-century buildings at a main site adjacent to Fenner's, the Cambridge University Cricket Club ground, and between the City Centre and the railway station.

History
In 1878 the University of Cambridge established a Teachers' Training Syndicate to develop a training curriculum in education for students of the university intending to become teachers. Hughes Hall was established in 1885 as a college for women graduate students taking the Teacher Training curriculum. Key amongst its early supporters and founders were Rev. G. F. Browne, fellow of St Catharine's College, Miss Frances Buss, headmistress of the North London Collegiate School, Miss Anne Clough, first principal of Newnham College, and Professor James Ward, fellow of Trinity College.

The college was founded as the Cambridge Training College for Women, and it began with 14 students in a small house in Newnham called Crofton Cottage. The first principal was a graduate of Newnham College, Elizabeth Phillips Hughes (1851-1925), who was in post from 1885 to 1899. In 1895, the college moved to a purpose-built building, designed by architect William Fawcett, overlooking Fenner's cricket ground - which continues to be the main college building to this day. One of the first matriculants, Molly Thomas, recounted the experience of the first class of students in A London Girl of the 1880s, published under her married name, M.V. Hughes.

Following recognition of full membership of the university for women in 1947, the college became a recognized institution of the university in 1949 and was renamed Hughes Hall in honour of its first principal. The college became an approved foundation of the university in 1985, and received a Royal Charter marking its full college status in 2006.

The college's first male students arrived in 1973, making Hughes Hall the first of the all-female colleges to admit men, and from that time students began to study a wider range of affiliated post-graduate degrees. Student numbers gradually increased in the 1980s and 1990s. Today, Hughes Hall has about 500 graduate students and around 90 undergraduates, all students are "mature" (aged over 21), and the college accommodates study in the wide range of studies taught in the university. The college is one of the most international Cambridge colleges, with its students representing over 60 nationalities.

In November 2019, Prince Andrew resigned as the honorary fellow of Hughes Hall amid the Jeffrey Epstein scandal.

College site

Buildings

The college's main building, known as the Wileman Building, was designed by architect William Fawcett and built in 1895. It was opened by Liberal politician George Robinson, 1st Marquess of Ripon. The building is Grade II listed, red brick in Neo-Dutch style, and has a notable terracotta porch. One wing of the Wileman Building is named the Pfeiffer Wing, after husband and wife Jurgen Edward Pfeiffer and Emily Pfeiffer who funded much of the construction cost as part of their mission to support and develop women's education. The building, and its more modern wings, contains student rooms, the college library, social areas and study spaces, and various college administrative offices. Next door to the Wileman Building is Wollaston Lodge, a symmetrical early-20th-century building in buff brick, designed by Edward Schroeder Prior, that provides further student accommodation.

More recent buildings on the college site, all of which provide accommodation and other facilities for students, include Chancellor’s Court, inaugurated in 1992 by the then Chancellor of the University, the Duke of Edinburgh, and the Centenary Building, which opened in 1997. In 2005 Hughes opened a new residential, dining, and meeting building, the Fenner's Building, which is beside and overlooks the university cricket ground, also named Fenner's. It is possible to see the spire of the Our Lady and the English Martyrs Church—the tallest church spire in Cambridge—from the building's west-facing windows and terraces. The college also owns a number of houses in the nearby area which provide additional student accommodation.

In 2014 the college acquired the former Cambridge University gym building on Gresham Road, which is across the cricket ground from the main college site, to develop as a new facility—construction began on the site in 2015.

Location
The main college site is near the middle of Cambridge, halfway between Cambridge railway station and the Market Square. The college is located in the Petersfield area of the city, close to Mill Road and accessible from Mortimer Road. The main site is in a mainly residential area, and it is beside Fenner's, the Cambridge University Cricket Club ground, and across the road from Parkside Pools and Kelsey Kerridge Gym, which are the main public sports facilities in the city. A short walk from the college is the Mill Road Cemetery where a number of the university's renowned historic figures, including astronomer James Challis, Isaac Newton's editor Percival Frost, and historian John Seeley are buried.

Transport links
Hughes Hall is the nearest of the university's colleges to Cambridge railway station and to the main city centre arrival-departure point for long-distances coaches at Parkside. The most direct access route from the college into the centre of Cambridge for cyclists and pedestrians is across Parker's Piece, an open park where the rules of football were first codified (1848).

Student life

Students and fellows of the college take part in research and study across the full spectrum of the University of Cambridge's fields of activity. Hughes Hall is known for its international and egalitarian ethos, the college does not have a high table. Students can walk on college lawns.

The college's historic establishment in the 19th century with the purpose of supporting graduate study in education has continued and developed over time with a significant number of students each year taking courses in professional and applied fields, alongside those studying and carrying out research in more traditional Arts and Humanities subjects. With a mainly postgraduate student body, undergraduates share facilities and an intellectual culture with PhD researchers and MPhil students.

The college punt is called "Buffyfish". It was built by former graduate students at Hughes and donated to the MCR.

Societies and sports
Hughes Hall has an active student sports calendar with college teams in Athletics, Badminton, Basketball, Cricket, Football, Rowing, Rugby, Squash, Table Tennis, and others. Members of the college are also active in sports and teams at university and national level.

There are a number of college societies, including a Chess Club, Film Society, Writing Group, and Law Society amongst others. The college's "Hat Club" organises events where students and fellows present papers on their research and study to an audience of college members, and the Enterprise Society supports and encourages students with an interest in starting their own business.

Music
The college's main performance space is the Pavilion Room which hosts a number of regular musical groups and organizations. The Stradivari Trust, the Cambridge Graduate Orchestra, and the college's Margaret Wileman Society use the space on a regular basis. There is also a programme of ad hoc student recitals and concerts, including by the college choir which incorporates students and fellows of the college.

Boat Club

Hughes Hall Boat Club is the rowing club of the college, in 2003 there was an official merger with the boat club of Lucy Cavendish College (then a graduate women-only college of the university) creating the "Hughes Hall/Lucy Cavendish Combined Boat Club".

The Club has been successful in the May Bumps with the men's first crew winning blades (a distinction accorded to a boat bumping each day of the bumps) in 1993, 1995, 1996, 1997, 2001, 2002, 2003, 2004, 2007, 2009, 2011, 2013 and 2014. Uniquely, the Club has been recipient of the Pegasus Cup, awarded to the most successful college boat club competing in the May Bumps each year, three times (2007, 2009, 2014). The women's first crew won blades for the first time after the demerger from Lucy Cavendish in the Lent Bumps 2019.

Members of Hughes Hall have regularly been selected for the Cambridge team in the Oxford-Cambridge Boat Race. In 2015, the men's team included three members of Hughes Hall (Jasper Holst, Ben Ruble, Henry Hoffstot), and the women's boat was coxed by a member of the college (Rosemary Ostfeld). Henry Hoffstot also appeared for Cambridge in the Race in 2014. In 2019, two members of the Cambridge Blue Crew were present in the men's first crew for May Bumps, including Cambridge University Boat Club President Dara Alizadeh. Also present in the boat was Cambridge University Boat Club rower Grant Bitler and Spare-Pair rower Harry Baxter.

The Boat Club houses its six rowing shells in the Emmanuel College boathouse.

May Ball
Hughes Hall holds a May Ball each year, often with a global or international theme. In 2015, the theme was "Around the World in 12 Hours" and in 2014 the theme was "Terra do Brasil".

Lectures
The college hosts a number of lectures and talks throughout the year. Amongst the most significant annual events are the City Lecture, the Kathleen Hughes Memorial Lecture, and the Honor Chapman Lecture.

The City Lecture invites speakers from the business and commercial worlds, it was established in 2000. Speakers in recent years have included Lionel Barber, the editor of the Financial Times, and Sir Martin Sorrell, chief executive of WPP plc.

The Kathleen Hughes Memorial Lecture is given in association with the University of Cambridge Department of Anglo-Saxon, Norse and Celtic. Recent speakers have included Dr James Fraser on Iona and the Burial Places of the Kings of Alba, and Prof Nancy Edwards, on The Early Medieval Sculpture of Wales. A pamphlet is produced in association with the lecture by the Department of Anglo-Saxon, Norse and Celtic.

The Honor Chapman Lecture was instituted in 2014 - the first two speakers were Dame Judith Mayhew Jonas, lawyer and academic, and Alison Nimmo CBE, chief executive of the Crown Estate.

Notable members

Principals/Presidents
The college's head was titled as "Principal" until 1973, and subsequently as "President".

Principals
1885–1899: Elizabeth Hughes
1899–1902: Margaret Punnett 
1902–1908: Helena Powell 
1908–1933: Mary Hay Wood 
1933–1945: Henriette Dent 
1945–1953: Marguerite Verini 
1953–1973: Margaret Wileman

Presidents
1973–1978: Sir Desmond Lee
1978–1984: Richard D'Aeth
1984–1989: Basil Herbertson
1989–1993: Desmond Hawkins
1993–1998: John Dingle
1998–2006: Peter Richards
2006–2014: Sarah Squire
2014: Anthony Freeling
2022: Laurie Bristow

Fellows
Nevin Hughes-Jones, haematologist, Fellow of the Royal Society
Neil Mercer, Professor of Education in the University of Cambridge
Marc Weller, University of Cambridge Professor of International Law and International Constitutional Studies

Alumni

Honorary Fellows
Nigel Brown OBE, former chairman of N.W. Brown Group Ltd
John Dingle, Director of the Strangeways Research Laboratory (1979–1993), President of Hughes Hall (1993–1998)
Sir Terence English, pioneer transplant surgeon
Hermann Hauser FRS, pioneer technology entrepreneur
John Hopkins, former Cambridge University Lecturer in Law, former Hughes Hall Director of Studies in Law
Dame Cleo Laine, jazz and pop singer, actress
Peter Mansfield FRS, physicist and Nobel laureate
Nicholas Phillips, Baron Phillips of Worth Matravers, President of the UK Supreme Court (2009–2012)
Dame Janet Smith, former Judge of the High Court and Court of Appeals
Evan Wallach, Judge of the United States Court of Appeals for the Federal Circuit

References

Further reading 
Histories of the college were written in its centenary in 1985, and the 125th anniversary of its foundation in 2010:
 Margaret Bottrall, Hughes Hall 1885-1985 (Cambridge, 1985).
 M.V. Hughes, A London Girl of the 1880s (Oxford, 1936).
 Ged Martin, Hughes Hall Cambridge 1885-2010 (Third Millennium Publishing, 2011).

External links 

College MCR website

 
Colleges of the University of Cambridge
Educational institutions established in 1885
1885 establishments in England
Former women's universities and colleges in the United Kingdom
Teacher training colleges in the United Kingdom